Jason Dewande Bell (born April 1, 1978) is an American former professional football player who was a cornerback in the National Football League (NFL) for the Dallas Cowboys, Houston Texans and New York Giants. Bell played college football for the UCLA Bruins.

Early life
Bell was born on April 1, 1978 in Long Beach, California to parents Cortland and Geraldine Bell. He attended Robert A. Millikan High School, where he played quarterback, wide receiver and cornerback. As a senior, he posted 70 tackles, 5 interceptions, 19 passes defensed, 26-yards average in kickoff returns, 12-yards average in punt returns, while receiving All-league and All-city honors. He finished his high school career with 196 tackles, 12 interceptions, 38 passes defensed

He also practiced track, recording 10.7 seconds in the 100-meter dash, 21.89 seconds in the 200-meter dash and 22-feet in the long jump.

College career
Bell accepted a football scholarship from University of California, Los Angeles (UCLA). As a true freshman, he played mainly on special teams for the Bruins. The next year, he started the final 5 games, posting 18 tackles and 4 passes defended.

In 1998, he contributed to the team winning the Pacific-10 Conference championship, while making 38 tackles and leading the team in passes defended (14).

In 1999, he was granted an additional year of eligibility due to a medical hardship, after his season was cut short from a surgery that removed bone spurs from his right heel. As a senior, he registered 42 tackles and 9 passes defended. He majored in history.

Professional career

Dallas Cowboys
Bell was signed as an undrafted free agent by the Dallas Cowboys after the 2001 NFL Draft, and made the roster based on his strong special teams play. As a gunner, he led the team in special teams tackles with 21. He was waived on September 1, 2002.

Houston Texans
On September 2, 2002, he was claimed off waivers by the Houston Texans and became a part of the inaugural season of the franchise. He led the team with 14 special teams tackles, even though he missed the first 3 games with a fractured right wrist. He received the Ed Block Courage Award at the end of the year.

Bell would remain a core special teams player during his time with the Houston Texans. In 2003, he was second on the team with 15 special teams tackles, even though he was declared inactive for 3 games with a knee injury.

In 2004, he registered 6 special teams tackles. On November 17, he was placed on the injured reserve list after breaking his right forearm while covering a punt against the Indianapolis Colts.

New York Giants
On March 13, 2006, Bell was signed as an unrestricted free agent by the New York Giants and was moved to safety during the season. He also played four games with a fractured right forearm he sustained in week 12 against the Tennessee Titans. Bell aggravated a back injury while working out during the offseason and was placed on the injured reserve list on July 25, 2007. He retired in 2008, after having career-ending back surgery the previous year.

Personal life
After his retirement from the NFL, he transitioned into private wealth management. He joined Masters Private Client Group, where he is currently a partner, specializing in professional athletes and entertainers and their unique financial needs. He has been noted as one of the “Top 36 Football Players on Wall Street” by Business Insider.

In addition to his business work, he currently works as an NFL pundit, working alongside Osi Umenyiora, originally for the BBC's coverage of the league on their preview and highlights shows. As of 2022 the show has moved to ITV. Also in 2022 Bell became part of the NFL coverage on Sky Sports, covering their live Sunday games in-studio.

Bell dated Nadine Coyle from British-Irish girl group Girls Aloud in 2008, and they were engaged at one point but later separated. They reunited sometime in 2013, with Nadine announcing her pregnancy in August that year. She gave birth to their daughter, Anaíya, in early 2014. The couple split in 2019 but still remain friends.

On September 1, 2020, it was announced that Bell would be a contestant on season 18 of the British TV dancing contest Strictly Come Dancing, the originator of the global Dancing with the Stars franchise. He was partnered with Luba Mushtuk. In week three he was in the dance-off against Nicola Adams and Katya Jones and lost, therefore leaving the show.

References

External links
 UCLA profile

1978 births
Living people
American football cornerbacks
American football safeties
Dallas Cowboys players
Houston Texans players
New York Giants players
UCLA Bruins football players
Players of American football from Long Beach, California
American expatriate sportspeople in England
Ed Block Courage Award recipients